Enbridge Gas New Brunswick is a subsidiary of Enbridge that provides natural gas distribution in the Canadian province of New Brunswick. On December 4, 2018, Enbridge announced an agreement to sell Enbridge Gas New Brunswick to Liberty Utilities (Canada) LP, a wholly owned subsidiary of Algonquin Power and Utilities Corp., for a cash purchase price of CAD $331 million.

Based in Fredericton, the company receives gas from the Maritimes and Northeast Pipeline system and is regulated under the New Brunswick Energy and Utilities Board.

It currently operates systems in Westmorland County, York County, Sunbury County, Saint John County and Charlotte County.

Communities served
 Dieppe
 Fredericton
 Moncton
 Oromocto
 Riverview
 Sackville
 Saint John
 St. George
 St. Stephen
 Dorchester

References

External links
 Official website

Companies based in Fredericton
Natural gas companies of Canada
Enbridge